The Royal Military Order of St George is a military knighthood order of the Kingdom of Tonga.

History 
It was founded by King George Tupou V in 2009 to reward distinguished and meritorious military services by members of the uniformed services, including the Tonga Defence Services and foreigners.

Classes 
The Order is awarded in five classes:
 Grand Cross (GCStG)
 Grand Officer (GOStG)
 Commander (CStG)
 Officer (OStG)
 Member (MStG)

Insignia 
 The badge consists of a cross-hatched red-enamelled and gold-bordered Greek cross, having in its centre a medallion featuring in its centre an enamelled miniature of Saint George killing the dragon, the whole surrounded by a red ring with an inscription in gold letters "ROYAL MILITARY ORDER OF ST GEORGE". The badge is hanging from the sash through a royal crown of Tonga in gold.
 The breast star of the Order is a medallion, similar to the badge medallion, at the center of a radiating star of rhomboidal shape.
 The ribbon is completely dark red.

References

Orders, decorations, and medals of Tonga